Von is a Germanic-language preposition that approximately means of or from. When it prefixes a surname it is not capitalized unless it begins a sentence.

Von can mean the following:

People:
Eerie Von (born 1964), original bassist for the metal band Danzig
King Von (1994–2020), African American rapper
Ronnie Von (born 1944), Brazilian singer and television host
Von Freeman (1923–2012), American jazz saxophonist
Von Hayes (born 1958), former Major League Baseball player
Von Miller (born 1989), National Football League player
Von Wafer (born 1985), National Basketball Association player
Von Von Von, a character created by the humorist Hugh Gallagher

In music:
Von (band), an American black metal band formed in 1987
The Von, an American rock band formed in 2013
Von (album) by Sigur Rós

VON may refer to:
Victorian Order of Nurses
Voice of Nigeria

See also 
 
 
 Vons (disambiguation)
 Vaughn (disambiguation)
 Vaughan (disambiguation)